Hydrodissection is the use of a directed jet of water to surgically separate tissues. It is generally used to develop tissue planes or divide soft tissues with less trauma than dissection using a cutting instrument. By using an appropriate pressure it will tend to follow the path of least resistance that is close to the direction of the jet.

Applications
In cataract surgery it is used to release the lens from its capsule by projecting a continuous flow of water from a cannula under the flap of the anterior capsule, which lifts the capsule membrane from the lens. By directing the flow the surgeon lifts the membrane around the sides and back of the capsule until the lens is completely loose as a prelude to phacoemulsification or direct extracapslar removal. 

Hydrodissection is also used in general surgery to release a trapped nerve or to reduce intraoperative blood losses.

See also
 Cataract surgery

References 

Eye surgery
Human eye anatomy
Lenses